Zuivka is an urban-type settlement in Khartsyzk Municipality in Donetsk Raion of Donetsk Oblast in eastern Ukraine. Population:

Demographics
Native language as of the Ukrainian Census of 2001:
 Ukrainian 15.57%
 Russian 83.37%
 Belarusian 0.19%
 Armenian 0.08%

References

Urban-type settlements in Donetsk Raion